The 1937–38 Bradford City A.F.C. season was the 31st in the club's history.

The club finished 14th in Division Three North, and reached the 3rd round of the FA Cup.

Sources

References

Bradford City A.F.C. seasons
Bradford City